Lloyd "Sonny" Dove (August 16, 1945 – February 14, 1983) was a Native American professional basketball player. As a star at St. John's University in New York, in his last season of 1967, Dove won the Haggerty Award.  That year he was part of the United States basketball team that won the gold medal at the Pan American Games in Winnipeg.

His record has continued to make him one of the top players ever at St. John's. In 2005 Dove was among the first ten men selected for "Basketball Legacy Honors" at the university. In 2011 Dove was inducted into the New York City Basketball Hall of Fame.

Early life and education
Lloyd Leslie Dove Jr. was born at Cape Cod Hospital in Hyannis, Massachusetts in 1945 and nicknamed "Sonny." His father was Lloyd Dove, an African-American from New Bern, North Carolina. Sonny's mother Adeline B. Dove (1921–2010) was Mashpee Wampanoag and the sister of Earl Mills Sr. (Flying Eagle), the hereditary sachem since 1956 of this people. His siblings are Larry Dove of Mashpee and Gladys Dove Barnes of Queens, N.Y. By Wampanoag matrilineal tradition, the children are considered to belong to the mother's clan.

The Doves divorced and the father moved to New York City where Sonny would ultimately move. In 1951 Adeline Dove married Donald Hicks Sr. of Mashpee, Massachusetts. She had more children with Donald: Donnella Hicks Pocknett, Errol Hicks, Donald Hicks Jr., and Gary Hicks, all of Mashpee.

Dove graduated from St. Francis Preparatory School in Brooklyn, where his skill at basketball was noted. He was recruited for St. John's University by Lou Carnesecca, the assistant basketball coach at the time.

College career

Dove attended St. John's University, where he was a forward and played for three seasons. He started under the legendary coach Joe Lapchick and was nicknamed the "Big Indian", as the team was called the Redmen. At St. John's, Dove as of 1983 was the fifth-highest scorer and second-ranked rebounder in its basketball history. In his last season of 1966–67, before being recruited by a professional team, Dove was captain of a team with a 23–5 record.

As of 2008, when Dove was selected posthumously for the "All-Century Team" of St. John's, he was one of only two players in the university basketball program's history with more than 1,000 career points (he ranked 10th with 1,576 points) and more than 1,000 career rebounds (he ranked 2nd with 1,036).

Career and death
Dove was selected by the Detroit Pistons with the fourth pick of the 1967 NBA draft. He played two years with the Pistons before joining the New York Nets of the ABA, with whom he remained until 1972. In his NBA/ABA career, Dove averaged 11.1 points per game and 6.0 rebounds per game. His pro career ended when he shattered his leg in a bicycle accident.

After his pro career, Dove returned to St. John's University and completed his degree. He went into sports radio broadcasting, often sharing comments on basketball games with other former pro players.  In the 1980s he was partnered with Dave Halberstam in commenting on St. John's University basketball games.

Dove was also a taxi driver. He died at age 37 from injuries in an accident when the taxi he was driving skidded off a partially open bridge into the Gowanus Canal in Brooklyn in February 1983. A memorial Mass was held at St. Catherine of Siena Roman Catholic Church, St. Albans, Queens.

Marriage and family
Dove was married to Patricia. At the time of his death, Dove and his wife were separated. Dove had three children: Zaynid and Kimberly with Patricia, and Leslie with common-law wife Ellen.

Legacy and honors
1967, Haggerty Award
1967, Consensus NCAA All-American Second Team
1967 gold medal for basketball team, Pan American Games, Winnipeg
2005, named among the first 10 men selected for "Basketball Legacy Honors" at St. John's University
2008, named to St. John's University "All-Century Team"
2011, inducted into the New York City Basketball Hall of Fame

Further reading
Earl Mills Sr. and Alicja Mann, Son of Mashpee: Reflections of Chief Flying Eagle, a Wampanoag, Tucson, Arizona: Word Studio, 1996, Revised Edition 2006, 
Earl Mills Sr. and Betty Breen, Cape Cod Wampanoag Cookbook: Traditional New England & Indian Recipes, Images & Lore, [Paperback], Clear Light Books, 2000

References

External links

"Earl Mills Sr., Flying Eagle, Chief", Mashpee Wampanoag Website
N.Y. Times Obituary for Sonny Dove
 

.

1945 births
1983 deaths
All-American college men's basketball players
Allentown Jets players
American men's basketball players
Basketball players at the 1967 Pan American Games
Basketball players from New York City
Detroit Pistons draft picks
Detroit Pistons players
New York Nets players
Pan American Games gold medalists for the United States
Power forwards (basketball)
Road incident deaths in New York City
Sportspeople from Brooklyn
St. John's Red Storm men's basketball players
Mashpee Wampanoag people
Pan American Games medalists in basketball
Native American basketball players
American taxi drivers
Medalists at the 1967 Pan American Games
20th-century Native Americans
African-American Catholics